The  was a 5,974-gross register ton passenger ship that was built by Kawasaki Dockyard Company, Kobe, for Tōyō Kisen Kabushiki Kaisha, launched in 1931. She was requisitioned by the Imperial Japanese Army and fitted out as a fast troop transport.

She was part of the invasion fleet that landed troops during the invasion of Ambon on 30 January 1942, and part of the invasion fleet at Buna and Gona.

On 4 March 1944, she was damaged when struck by a large wave and driven aground off Matsuwa Jima, in the Kuril Islands.

See also
Kawasaki Shipbuilding Corporation
Imperial Japanese Army Railways and Shipping Section

Notes

References
 Blair, Clay, Jr. Silent Victory. Philadelphia: Lippincott, 1975.

External links
Chronological List of Japanese Merchant Vessel Losses

1930 ships
Ships built by Kawasaki Heavy Industries
Ships of the Imperial Japanese Army
Auxiliary ships of the Imperial Japanese Navy
Ships sunk by American submarines